is a passenger railway station in located in the city of  Wakayama, Wakayama Prefecture, Japan, operated by the private railway company Wakayama Electric Railway. The station is named after the nearby Hinokuma Shrine, which is also alternatively pronounced  as "Nichizengū".

Lines
Nichizengū Station is served by the Kishigawa Line, and is located 1.4 kilometers from the terminus of the line at Wakayama Station.

Station layout
The station consists of one island platform with a level crossing. There is no station building and the station is unattended.

Adjacent stations

History
It was renamed to its present name in 1933.

Passenger statistics

Surrounding Area
Hinokuma Shrine / Kunikakasu Shrine
Narugami Shell Mound, National Historic Site as a national historic site. 
Wakayama Prefectural Koyo Junior and Senior High School
Wakayama City Nisshin Junior High Schoo
Wakayama City Miya Elementary School

See also
List of railway stations in Japan

References

External links
 
  Nichizengū Station timetable

Railway stations in Japan opened in 1916
Railway stations in Wakayama Prefecture
Wakayama (city)